Omoniyun is a 2019 Nigerian film produced by Dayo Amusa and directed by Muyiwa Ademola under the production company of Amzadol Productions. The movie that centered around agitating against the molestation of a girl child stars actors and actresses such as Segun Arinze, Toyin Alausa, Dayo Amusa and Bimbo Thomas.

Synopsis 
The movie revolves around the story of a young girl that was sexually harassed by a prince who usually go Scot free with evil deed. The movie became tensed when the prince had to struggle for his life when human rights activists decided to take up the matter.

Premiere 
The movie was premiered on 29 November 2019 at Ozone Cinema in Yaba. Since the movie was set in 1980s, all the attendees such as Iyabo Ojo, Sotayo, Bimbo Thomas, Toyin Alausa, Odunlade Adekola, Muyiwa Ademola, Seliat Adebowale and many others dressed in 1980s costume.

Cast 
Segun Arinze
Dayo Amusa
Muyiwa Ademola
Toyin Alausa
Olaiya Igwe
Nkechi Blessing
Seilat Adebowale
Bimbo Thomas

References 

2019 films
Nigerian drama films